Gollapudi Maruti Rao (14 April 1939 – 12 December 2019) was an Indian actor, screenwriter, dramatist, playwright, columnist  and dialogue writer known for his works in Telugu cinema, Telugu theatre and Telugu Literature. Rao acted in over 250 Telugu films in a variety of roles.
His noted literary works and plays, like Rendu Rellu Aaru, Patita, Karuninchani Devatalu, Mahanatudu, Kaalam Venakku Tirigindi, Aasayaalaku Sankellu, won numerous State Awards.

He was a member of the Script Scrutiny Committee of National Film Development Corporation and served as a Jury Member at International Film Festival of India for Indian Panorama section in 1996. He was known for scripting landmark films like Doctor Chakravarthy, Tharangini, Samsaram Chadharangam, Kallu etc. He garnered six Andhra Pradesh State Nandi Awards. In 1997, he established the Gollapudi Srinivas Memorial Foundation, which presents the Gollapudi National Award, for the best first film of a director in Indian cinema.

Rao was also known for his works in All India Radio and Journalism, for over two decades. His play was included in the Master of Arts (Telugu literature) curriculum of Osmania University. This work was translated into all Indian languages by the National Book Trust, under the Aadaan Pradaan programme. The work was remade into a Telugu film in 1988 which won the Nandi Award for the Best Story in 1989. His 1975 play Kallu, was also remade into a Telugu film Kallu, which also garnered Nandi Award for Best Feature Film. His play Oka Chettu – Rende Puvvulu was purchased by the Song and Drama Division, Ministry of Information and Broadcasting for popular exhibition.

A volume of essays on theatre, Telugu Nataka Rangam, was prescribed as a textbook for the Department of Theatre Arts, Andhra University, Visakhapatnam (1967). He published two research articles appearing in Andhra Vignana Sarvaswam (Telugu Encyclopedia) 11th volume: "History of the development in 'Thought' and 'Technique' of Telugu Play-writing" and "Amateur Theatre – its origin and growth in relation to the World Amateur Theatre movement. His Telugu play Vandemaataram, the first one in Telugu about the Sino-Indian War, was published by Andhra Pradesh State Information & Public Relations Department, (1963).

Early life
Maruti Rao was born in a Telugu-speaking brahmin family on 14 April 1939, in Nandabalaga Village, Vizianagaram District, Andhra Pradesh, India and graduated from Andhra University, Visakhapatnam, Andhra Pradesh in 1959 specializing in B.SC Mathematical Physics.

Literary activity
Maruti Rao has written and published several plays (9), playlets (18), novels (12), story volumes (4), essays (2), children's stories (3).
He wrote a weekly column, "Jeevana Kaalam" (The Living Times), a kaleidoscopic study of contemporary social and political issues for over 24 years. It was a very popular feature in one of the largest circulated Telugu dailies of Andhra Pradesh, Andhra Jyothy, and the feature continued to appear in Vaartha (Daily). His column with an audio reading (his voice) is presented, in an internet magazine Koumudi.

His autobiography Amma Kadupu Challaga, a 550-page compendium of his memoirs was released in India, USA and Australia.
A travelogue Tanzania Teerthayatra was published by Koumudi in the US in 2008 in its collection. It is based on 15-day safari with his friend Ganti Prasada Rao in the major national parks and historical places in Tanzania. The novel Pidikedu Aakaasham was released as an audio publication on 16 February 2009 while conferring the Lifetime Achievement Award by the Vanguri Foundation in Hyderabad.

Death
He died on 12 December 2019 in Chennai. The loss of Gollapudi Maruti Rao was mourned by several noted writers and members of the Telugu film fraternity.

Awards
Nandi Awards
 Best Story Writer - Aatma Gowravam (1965)
Best Story Writer - Kallu (1988)
 Best Male Comedian – Tarangini (1983)
 Best Character Actor – Ramayanamlo Bhagavatham (1985)
 Best Dialogue Writer – Master Kapuram (1990)
 Best Screenplay Writer – Prema Pusthakam (1993)
 Nandi Award for Best actor (Television) (1996)

All India Radio Awards
 Best Script in the Inter-University Radio play contest conducted by All India Radio, for Anantam (1959)
 Mahatma Gandhi Award for Creative Literature in an All India Contest, for Prasna

Literary awards and honours
Sangam Academy Awards
 Sangam Academy Award for Best Play Kallu (1975)
 Sarvaraya Dharmanidhi Puraskaram for the Best Humorous writing (1983)

Other awards
 Gurazada Apparao Memorial Gold Medal by Vamsee Art Theatre (1985)
 Telugu Velugu Award (1987)
 Madras Telugu Academy Award for Best All-rounder (1996)
 Paidi Lakshmayya Dharmanidhi Puraskaram (2002)
 Pulikanti Krishna Reddy Puraskaram (2007)
 Sarvaraya Memorial Puraskaram
 Andhra Nataka Kala Parishad Award
 Narasaraopeta Rangasthali Pratibha Puraskaram (2018) # First award recipient

Selected filmography
Actor

 Abdulla (1960)
 Intlo Ramayya Veedhilo Krishnayya (1982) - Subbarao
 Idi Pellantara (1982)
 Palletoori Monagadu (1983)
 Abhilasha (1983) - Pydithalli
 Trisulam (1983)
 Gudachari No.1 (1983)
 Aalaya Sikharam (1983)
 Shivudu Shivudu Shivudu (1983)
 Mukku Pudaka (1984)
 Devanthakudu (1984)
 Srimathi Kaavali (1984)
 Challenge (1984)
 Manishiko Charitra (1984)
 Swati (1984)
 Sri Katna Leelalu (1985)
 Moodila muchata (1985)
 Maa Pallelo Gopaludu (1985)
 Swathi Muthyam (1986)
 Captain Nagarjuna (1986)
 Mannemlo Monagadu (1986)
 Kaliyuga Krishnudu (1986) - Sambaiah
 Konte Kapuram (1986)
 Sakkanodu (1986)
 Donga Mogudu (1987)
 Bhargava Ramudu (1987)
 Agni Putrudu (1987)
 Srinivasa Kalyanam (1987)
 Kirai Dada (1987)
 Jebu Donga (1987)
 Ummadi Mogudu (1987)
 Samsaram Oka Chadarangam (1987) - Appala Narasaiah
 Bhale Mogudu (1987)
 Madana Gopaludu (1987)
 Yamudiki Mogudu (1988) - Kailasam
 Murali Krishnudu (1988)
 Varasudochadu (1988)
 Pelli Chesi Choodu (1988) - Parameswara Rao
 Chikkadu Dorakadu (1988)
 Bharyabhartala Bandam (1988)
 Jamadagni (film) (1988)
 Agni Keratalu (1988)
 Kaliyuga Karnudu (1988) as Lawyer Bhanumurthy
 Prema (1989)
 Goonda Rajyam (1989) - Bangaraiah
 Bhale Dampathulu (1989)
 Simha Swapnam (1989)
 Shiva (1989)
 Indrudu Chandrudu (1989)
 Yama Pasam (1989)
 Soggadi Kapuram (1989)
 Dorikithe Dongalu (1989) as Pithambaram
 Muthyamantha Muddu (1989)
 Chettu Kinda Pleader (1989) - Sarabhayya
 Kodama Simham (1990)
 Iddaru Iddare (1990)
 Police Bharya (1990)
 Raja Vikramarka (1990) - Kanaka Rao
 Assembly Rowdy (1991)
 Aditya 369 (1991) - Curator
 Prema Entha Madhuram (1991) - Narayan Rao
 Balarama Krishnulu (1992) - Villain
 Sundara Kanda (1992)
 Golmaal Govindam (1992)
 Gharana Alludu (1994)
 Punya Bhoomi Naa Desam (1994)
 Subha Sankalpam (1995) - Chennakesava Rao
 Vajram (1995)
 Hey Ram (2000, Tamil/Hindi film) - Govardhan
 Murari (2001) - Chanti
 Andamaina Manasulo (2008)
 Rainbow (2008)
 Leader (2010)
 Inkosari (2010)
 Broker (2010) - Master
 Dhoni (2012)
 Daruvu (2012) - Chief Minister
 Uu Kodathara? Ulikki Padathara? (2012) - Venkat Rao
 Sukumarudu (2013)
 Rowdy Fellow (2014)
 Kanche (2015) - Kondayya
 Size Zero (2015)
 Inji Iduppazhagi (2015, Tamil film)
 Brahmotsavam (2016)
 Manamantha (2016)
 Ism (2016)
 Prematho Mee Karthik (2017)
 Jodi (2019)

Television
 Intinti Ramayanam (1997)
 Kanyasulkam (2015)

Writer
Chelleli Kapuram (1971)
Raitu Kutumbam (1972)
Dorababu (1974)
O Seeta Katha (1974)
Annadammula Anubandham (1975)
Nindu Manishi (1978)
Maavari Manchitanam (1979)
Subhalekha (1982)
Kallu (1988)
Intlo Ramayya Veedhilo Krishnayya (1982)

Director
Prema Pustakam (1993)

References

Telugu writers
Telugu male actors
People from Vizianagaram
Indian radio personalities
Telugu-language writers
Andhra University alumni
20th-century Indian dramatists and playwrights
Indian male dramatists and playwrights
Telugu-language dramatists and playwrights
1939 births
2019 deaths
Nandi Award winners
Male actors from Andhra Pradesh
Screenwriters from Andhra Pradesh
Indian male screenwriters
Telugu screenwriters
Male actors in Telugu cinema
Indian male film actors
Indian male stage actors
20th-century Indian male actors
Male actors in Telugu theatre
20th-century Indian male writers
People from Uttarandhra